Franc Veliu (born 11 November 1988 in Vlorë) is an Albanian professional footballer who plays mainly as a defender for Kosovan club Gjilani and the Albania national team. His natural position is left back but he has also played as a left midfielder and even as a central defender.

He only played for one club team at professional level between 2006 and 2015, before joining Kukësi in 2015. He has only ever won two trophies in his career so far, two times Albanian Cup in 2009 and 2014 after winning in the final against Tirana and against current club Kukësi in 2009 and 2014 respectively.

Club career

Flamurtari Vlorë
He made his debut for Flamurtari Vlorë in 2006 and since then has cemented his place in his hometown club's first team. He has spent most of his career in the left back position but he has also played as a left midfielder and most recently as a central defender as well. On 29 October 2008, he scored his first hat-trick, an unusual achievement for a defender, in a 1–6 away win against Naftëtari Kuçovë valid for the first leg of the first round of 2008–09 Albanian Cup.

He was voted Flamurtari's player of the year for 2014 by the club's fans, beating Bruno Telushi and Ardit Shehaj who came second and third respectively.

Kukësi
After making 263 appearances for Flamurtari between 2006 and 2015, Veliu left to join fellow Albanian Superliga club Kukësi.

Partizani Tirana
On 1 February 2016, Veliu joined Partizani Tirana where he signed a contract until the end of the season with an option to extend it for a further year. After some matches in bench, Veliu made his first appearance with Red Bulls on 20 March by playing in the last 13 minutes of a 0–2 win at Teuta Durrës. He played his first match as starter later on 17 April in the 3–0 home win over Vllaznia Shkodër; he was however replace at the end of first half. Veliu left the club following the end of the season after making only three appearances, collecting only 80 minutes as the team finished runner-up in the championship.

Return to Flamurtari Vlorë
On 22 July 2016, Veliu officially returned to Flamurtari Vlorë by joining as a free agent. He was allocated his old squad number 11, and made his return debut on 7 September in the opening league match of the season, a 2–1 away defeat to Skënderbeu Korçë. On 27 May, in the final matchday, Veliu scored his first goal of the season after an individual effort in a 3–0 win over Korabi Peshkopi, as Flamurtari avoided the relegation by just one point. In June, following the departure of team captain Bruno Telushi in Croatia, Veliu was renamed the new captain, three years after losing the status. He suffered a major injury during the summer preparation phase which forced him to miss the entire first half of 2017–18 season. On 22 July 2017, Veliu signed a contract running until July 2018. He returned on action in the first days of January 2018 where he played in a friendly against the under-19 side.

Gjilani
In summer 2019, Veliu moved abroad to play for Football Superleague of Kosovo side Gjilani.

International career
Veliu was selected by Josip Kuže for a friendly against Argentina on 20 June 2011. He was in the starting line up on his debut in a game which ended in a 4–0 loss.

Personal life
Veliu was arrested on 25 October 2015 for drunk driving. His vehicle was confiscated, and Veliu was jailed for one month.

Career statistics

Club

International

Honours

Club
Flamurtari Vlorë
Albanian Cup: 2008–09, 2013–14

Individual
Albanian Superliga Player of the Month: November 2010

References

External links

 Profile - FSHF
Profile at Football Database

1988 births
Living people
Footballers from Vlorë
Albanian footballers
Association football fullbacks
Albania international footballers
Albania under-21 international footballers
Flamurtari Vlorë players
FK Kukësi players
FK Partizani Tirana players
SC Gjilani players
Kategoria Superiore players
Football Superleague of Kosovo players
Albanian expatriate footballers
Expatriate footballers in Kosovo
Albanian expatriate sportspeople in Kosovo